William Ross MacLean (February 6, 1872 – June 22, 1931) was a soda water manufacturer and political figure in British Columbia. He represented Nelson City from 1912 to 1916 as a Conservative.

He was born in Lorne, Pictou County, Nova Scotia, the son of Daniel K. MacLean and Sarah Ross, and was educated in Pictou. In 1912, MacLean married Mary Helen Clarke. He died in Nelson at the age of 59.

References 

1872 births
1936 deaths
British Columbia Conservative Party MLAs
People from Pictou County